Art MacPhelim O'Gallagher,  was Bishop of Raphoe from his appointment by the papacy in 1547 until the death of Queen Mary I in 1558. He died at Cenmaghair on 13 August 1561 and was greatly lamented in Tirconnell.

Notes

1561 deaths
Roman Catholic bishops of Raphoe
Year of birth unknown